Delord is a surname. Notable people with the name include:

 Françoise Delord (1940–2021), French ornithologist and zoo owner
 Jacqueline Delord (born 1970), French swimmer

See also 

 Kent-Delord House, historic home in Plattsburgh, New York.